The 1935 Lower Hutt mayoral election was part of the New Zealand local elections held that same year. The elections were held for the role of Mayor of Lower Hutt plus other local government positions including the nine borough councillors, also elected biannually. The polling was conducted using the standard first-past-the-post electoral method.

Background
Jack Andrews, the incumbent Mayor sought re-election and retained office by being declared elected unopposed with no other candidates emerging.

The Labour Party put up an official ticket for the election, but chose not to stand a candidate for the mayoralty. It instead decided to put all its resources in to winning a majority on the council, thinking this was the best way to achieve their policies. They were opposed by the politically right-leaning New Zealand Legion. It was the first occasion the Legion had contested an election. The Legion's mayoral candidate (Andrews) was elected unopposed and a majority of Legion candidates were elected to the council. It also had candidates elected to the Wellington Hospital Board, Hutt Valley Electric Power Board and Hutt River Board. Its candidates for the Wellington Harbour Board and Eastbourne Borough Council were all defeated however. The Legion's president, Dr Campbell Begg, said he was pleased with the results.

Councillor results

Notes

References

Mayoral elections in Lower Hutt
1935 elections in New Zealand
Politics of the Wellington Region